Subanguina radicicola (Grass root-gall nematode) is a plant pathogenic nematode.

References

External links 
 Nemaplex, University of California - Subanguina radicicola

Tylenchida
Plant pathogenic nematodes